Motz is a commune in the Savoie department in the Auvergne-Rhône-Alpes region in south-eastern France.

Geography
The Fier forms most of the commune's northern border. The Rhône forms the commune's western border.

See also
Communes of the Savoie department

References
Commune de Motz - official site

Communes of Savoie